Tom Paarup Madsen known as Tom P. Madsen (born 24 November 1977) is a former speedway rider from Denmark.

Speedway career
He rode in the top tier of British Speedway riding for Belle Vue Aces during the 2006 Elite League speedway season. He began his British career riding for Berwick Bandits in 1999.

References 

1977 births
Living people
Danish speedway riders
Belle Vue Aces riders
Berwick Bandits riders
Oxford Cheetahs riders
People from Esbjerg
Sportspeople from the Region of Southern Denmark